17 is a greatest hits album by Puerto Rican singer Ricky Martin, released on CD and DVD by Sony BMG Norte in the United States and Latin America on November 18, 2008. The CD includes seventeen songs from seventeen years of Martin's music career. It contains thirteen Spanish-language hits, two English-language songs and two Spanglish tracks. 17 doesn't include any new material, however, some songs are featured in remixed versions. The DVD track listing varies from the CD and contains a few other hits.

Critical reception
The AllMusic review by Stephen Thomas Erlewine awarded the album 4 stars stating "Given its approach, it should be no surprise that this is heavy on Latin material, to the extent that even his huge crossover hit, "Livin' la Vida Loca," is here in Spanish rather than English. Therefore, this isn't a compilation for the curious fellow pop travelers who only want to hear turn-of-the-millennium monsters like "She Bangs," a hit single that's not even here. Instead, this is a sampler, giving a taste of what Martin has done over the years, and in that regard it's successful, even if it's not definitive".

Commercial performance
17 peaked inside top ten in Argentina and Mexico, and reached number sixteen in Spain, number nineteen in Greece, and number twenty-one on the Top Latin Albums in the United States.

Track listing

Charts

Weekly charts

Monthly charts

Year-end charts

Release history

References

2008 greatest hits albums
2008 video albums
Ricky Martin compilation albums
Ricky Martin video albums
Music video compilation albums
Sony BMG Norte compilation albums
Sony BMG Norte video albums
Spanish-language compilation albums
Spanish-language video albums
Columbia Records compilation albums
Columbia Records video albums